Tsaryova is a rural locality (a settlement) and the administrative center of Kalininskoye Rural Settlement, Totemsky District, Vologda Oblast, Russia. The population was 396 as of 2002.

Geography 
Tsaryova is located 26 km southwest of Totma (the district's administrative centre) by road. Yekimikha is the nearest rural locality.

References 

Rural localities in Tarnogsky District